The first USS Hancock was an armed schooner under the Continental Army during the American Revolutionary War. She was named for patriot and Continental Congress member John Hancock. Congress returned her to her owner in 1777.

Career
Hancock, was the former schooner Speedwell, hired from Mr. Thomas Grant of Marblehead, Massachusetts, in October 1775 as one of a small fleet fitting out to prey upon British supply ships and support General George Washington's siege of Boston, Massachusetts. This fleet, the first under Continental pay and control, came to be called "George Washington's Navy."

But the two schooners instead sought easier quarry off Cape Canso where five prizes of dubious legality were taken. They also raided Charlottetown settlement without regard to orders to respect Canadian property. The story of their illegal actions reached General Washington who dismissed both ship commanders and returned their prizes to Nova Scotian owners with apologies. 

On 1 January 1776, Captain John Manley, Continental Army, was appointed Commodore of the Fleet and hoisted his flag in Hancock. She captured two enemy transports on 25 January 1776, fending off an eight-gun British schooner in a brisk engagement while prize crews took the captured ships into Plymouth Harbor.

On 30 January 1776 the 14-gun British Brig Hope, which had sailed from Boston for the express purpose of capturing Hancock, intercepted her off Plymouth. Manley ran Hancock ashore where it became impossible for Hope, with her deeper draft, to draw close aboard. The Americans later refloated Hancock and she later captured several more prizes in joint operations with the squadron by April 1776, when Captain Samuel Tucker relieved Commodore John Manley in command of Hancock. Manley was taken into the Continental Navy to command the Continental frigate Hancock. 

The schooner Hancock captured two brigs off Boston 7 May 1776. She continued to cruise under Tucker until declared unfit for service late in 1776. She returned to her owner early the following year.

See also
 List of historical schooners

Citations and references
Citations

References
 

 

 

 

Schooners of the United States Navy
1770s ships
Ships named for Founding Fathers of the United States